12 Fife Lane, (also known as the first state house) Miramar, Wellington was the first state house under the First Labour Government of New Zealand. Completed in 1937, the three-bedroom, one-bathroom house was built with plastered brick walls and a concrete tile gable roof and sited on a  section The building is classified as a "Category I" ("places of special or outstanding historical or cultural heritage significance or value") historic place by the New Zealand Historic Places Trust.

The house was opened on 18 September 1937 by Prime Minister Michael Joseph Savage and several cabinet ministers. The ministers carried furniture into the house, including Savage carrying a rather cumbersome dining table. Savage carrying the table became "the defining symbol of the first Labour government's state housing programme".

The ministers handed the keys to the first tenants, David and Mary McGregor. David McGregor was a tram driver for the Wellington City Council, earning a wage of £4 7s 9d (equal to $8.78 in modern New Zealand dollars) per week. Out of this total he paid the state £1 10s 3d in rent ($3.03), just over a third of his pay. The house was sold to the McGregors in the early 1950s after the successor First National Government allowed state tenants to buy their houses. After David and Mary died in the early 1980s, the house was sold back to the Government in 1983 and became a state house again.

The house was the venue for the 50th anniversary of the state housing programme. For the 60th anniversary of state housing in 1997, The New Zealand Herald visited the house, which at the time was occupied by John and Winnie Nysse and their three children. The market rents imposed on state housing by the Fourth National Government meant the family were paying 73.5% of their income ($215 out of $292) in rent, compared to the 34.5% paid by the McGregors in 1937.

On 25 September 1986, the house was registered with the New Zealand Historic Places Trust as a Category I heritage item, with registration number 1360. It was registered for its historical significance (as a symbol of Labour's housing programme), for its cultural significance, and for its architectural significance.

References

External links
 New Zealand History Online

Buildings and structures in Wellington City
Heritage New Zealand Category 1 historic places in the Wellington Region
Houses in New Zealand
1930s architecture in New Zealand